Le Lignon is an urban development in the town of Vernier, canton of Geneva, Switzerland. It was built by architect George Addor between 1964 and 1966 and consists of three large buildings and is one of the largest apartment complexes in the world, containing 2,780 units. It is located on former farmland and was built to address a housing shortage in the 1960s and early 70s. It makes up a significant portion of the population of Vernier, a town of only some 34,000 residents. In the 2010s, the building went through a thermal insulation retrofit to improve performance.

References

Urban development
Planned communities